The  (lit. New Shōnan Bypass) is a 4-laned toll road in Kanagawa Prefecture, Japan. It is owned and managed by Central Nippon Expressway Company.

Overview

Officially the road is designated as a bypass for National Route 1.

An existing section of the road is also planned to be incorporated into the route of the Ken-Ō Expressway once adjoining sections of that expressway have been completed.

The first section of the road (8.4 km from Fujisawa Interchange to Chigasaki-nishi Interchange) was opened to traffic in 1988. A second section (6.7 km from Chigasaki-nishi Interchange to Ōiso-higashi Interchange) is planned; 1.6 km of the second section was opened to traffic in 1995. Beyond the terminus in Ōiso the road is expected to connect directly to the eastern terminus of the Seishō Bypass.

The toll for a regular passenger car to traverse the entire road is 400 yen. Electronic Toll Collection (ETC) is accepted for payment, however no discount programs are in effect.

List of interchanges and features
The entire expressway is in Kanagawa Prefecture. TB=Toll gate

References

External links 
 Central Nippon Expressway Company

Toll roads in Japan
Proposed roads in Japan